Grand Ayatollah Sheikh Muhammad-Hasan al-Najafi (1788–1850), also known as Sahib al-Jawahir, was a prominent Shiite religious authority and author. He was most known for his books of Jawahir al-Kalam Fi Sharh Shara’i‘ al-Islam, a 42-volume work on fiqh.

Birth
Though the exact date of Muhammad Hasan's birth is unclear, Agha Bozorg Tehrani, a renowned Shi’ite scholar from Iran, puts it at around 1212 lunar Hijri (AD 1797). His father, Shaykh Muhammad Baqir Najafi, along with his wife and Shaykh Muhammad Hassan’s mother, were the grandchildren of Shaykh Abu Al-Hassan Al-Futuni Al-Amili, who is from Jabal Amil, Lebanon.  His family lineage includes numerous religious scholars and his brother, Muhammad Hossein, who was killed as a young man.  Muhammad Hasan had eight sons, and several daughters.

Usuli movement and Najaf seminary
The appearance of Muhammad Hasan was the result of a development in which some important persons contributed. The Najaf seminary was the place where Akhbarism first appeared at the time when Muhammad Hasan lived in Najaf.  In fact, after the establishment of the Usuli school in Shia thought, scholars such as Muhammad Baqir Behbahani, Moḥammad Mahdī Baḥr al-ʿUlūm, and Shaykh Ja'far Kashef al-Ghita developed Usulism from those foundations. When Kashef al-Ghata died, Muhammad Hasan was appointed as the chief of Najaf seminary. Many of the scholars and Ulama supported him for this position. He became very famous after his Excellency Agha Sayyed Ibrahim died.  Muhammad Hasan then endorsed the injunctions of the late Ibrahim, and afterward became acquainted with the late Ibrahim's students. Shaykh Ansari was a pupil of Muhammad Hasan and he followed his teacher in managing the seminary.

It is said that the institution of the Marja' in Shi'ism was not centralized until the time of Muhammad Hasan. According to one of his students, during that time he developed the leadership of the Shia. Sayyed Muhammad Nasirabadi believes that Muhammad Hasan had an esoteric relationship with the twelfth Imam.

Opinions
Muhammad Hasan tried to continue the style of thought that has been started by Allamah Hilli: introducing substantial changes in tradition, without breaking the tradition altogether.

Works
Al Risalah al-Amaliyah
An essay on Alms and Khums
Najat al-'Ibad fi Yaum al-Ma'ad
Hidayat al-Nasekin
Jawahir al-Kalam

Pupils
Mulla Zayn al-'Abidin al-Mazandarani
Sayyid Husayn Kuhkamari'i
Mulla Ali Kani (the author of Idah al-mushtabahat wa tawdih al-maqal)
Muhammad Irawani
Shaykh Ja'far al-Shushtari
Shaykh Jawad (the author of Sharh al-lum'atayn)
Shaykh Muhsin Khanfar
Shaykh Muhsin A'sam (the author of Kashf al-falam)
Sayyid Asad Allah Isfahani
Shaykh al-'Iraqiyyin
Shaykh Hasan al-Mamaqani
Sayyid Husayn Bahr al-'Ulum
Sayyid Mahmud al-Burujirdi
Mulla Ali al-Khalili
Sayyid Ibrahim Shari'atmadar al-Sabziwari
Shaykh Murtaza Shushtari Ansari

References

Shia scholars of Islam
1850 deaths
1788 births
Iraqi encyclopedists